David Aubry (born 8 November 1996) is a French swimmer.

He competed in the Team event at the 2018 European Aquatics Championships, winning the bronze medal.

He has qualified to represent France at the 2020 Summer Olympics.

References

External links

1996 births
Living people
French male freestyle swimmers
European Aquatics Championships medalists in swimming
World Aquatics Championships medalists in swimming
Sportspeople from Saint-Germain-en-Laye
Swimmers at the 2020 Summer Olympics
Olympic swimmers of France
21st-century French people
20th-century French people